AISSMS (All India Shri Shivaji Memorial Society) Polytechnic is MSBTE Affiliated Polytechnic college located in Pune, Maharashtra, India. The college is affiliated with the MSBTE, Mumbai and was founded by Chattrapati Shri Shahu Maharaj and H. H. Shri Madhavraoji Scindia, leading to the college's establishment in 1994. The institute is located close to the Regional Transport Office and shares its campus with an Engineering college, pharmacy college and business school. At present, AISSMS offers Diploma in Six branches of.Polytechnic:
 Civil Engineering
 Computer Engineering
 Information Technology .......... 
 Electronics and Telecommunication Engineering 
 Instrumentation Engineering 
 Mechanical Engineering
 Automobile Engineering

Location
AISSMS Polytechnic is located in the heart of the city in the area of Shivajinagar.

Grounds
It has large sports grounds on campus.

Cultural and sports activities

Technovision 2013
State Level Technical Paper Presentation Competition was conducted successfully in All India Shri Shivaji Memorial Society’s Polytechnic on 22 March 2013. 
AISSMS Polytechnic organizes different programmes for all round development of the students. As a part of this programme, AISSMS’s Polytechnic organized the event named "Technovision" a State Level Technical Paper Presentation Competition" on 22 February 2013 for diploma engineering students of Maharashtra.

 All India Council for Technical Education
 Educational institutions established in 1994
1994 establishments in Maharashtra